Pleasant Valley Township is a township in Johnson County, Iowa, USA.

History
Pleasant Valley Township was organized in 1846. It is named from a scenic valley upon the Iowa River that early settlers found to contain an abundance of valuable timber.

References

Townships in Johnson County, Iowa
Townships in Iowa
1846 establishments in Iowa Territory